Ahamefule J. Oluo is an American musician, trumpeter, composer, stand-up comedian, and writer. He was the first artist-in-residence at Town Hall Seattle.

Career 
As a trumpeter, Oluo has performed or recorded with numerous prominent musicians and groups, including Das Racist, John Zorn, Hey Marseilles, Wayne Horvitz, Macklemore, and Julian Priester. He is a member of jazz quartet Industrial Revelation, winner of a 2014 Stranger Genius Award. The other members of Industrial Revelation are D'Vonne Lewis (drums), Evan Flory-Barnes (bass), and Josh Rawlings (keyboards).

In 2012, Oluo was selected as Town Hall Seattle's first-ever artist-in-residence. During his time as the artist-in-residence, he created an experimental autobiographical pop opera, "Now I'm Fine," about the year his father died. The full-length opera (co-written with Lindy West) debuted in December 2014, at On the Boards theater, complete with a 17-piece orchestra, and received positive reviews. Seattle Times critic Misha Berson said Oluo possibly created "a new art form" by combining his own big-band jazz pieces with a blend of standup comedy and memoir. The piece went on to New York City's Public Theater in January 2016 as part of the Under the Radar Festival and was also staged at the Clarice Smith Performing Arts Center at the University of Maryland in February 2017.  The New York Times reviewed the Public Theater run of "Now I'm Fine," saying that Oluo expanded the format of the "standard, modest, one-man confessional show" to "dizzying proportions" and described the score as "modernist jazz [that] leans toward solemnity, suggesting a New Orleans funeral march."

In 2020, Thin Skin was released, a film based on Oluo's off-Broadway play "Now, I'm Fine" and his This American Life episode "The Wedding Crasher." Oluo wrote the film's script with Lindy West and Charles Mudede.

As a comedian, he has collaborated closely with Hari Kondabolu, who described him in 2010 as "my great friend and writing partner."

Personal life 
Oluo is biracial; his father is a black immigrant from Nigeria and his mother is a white woman from Kansas.

Oluo married writer Lindy West on July 11, 2015. His older sister is writer and activist Ijeoma Oluo.

References

External links 

Put a Bow on It, episode of This American Life, October 9, 2015. Act 2, "The Wedding Crasher", is a 23-minute autobiographical piece by Oluo.
 Paulette Beete, Art Talk with Ahamefule J. Oluo, Art Works Blog (blog of the National Endowment for the Arts), February 17, 2016
 Industrial Revelation – Full Performance (Live on KEXP), recorded November 23, 2016, published February 3, 2017, official KEXP account on YouTube.

American jazz trumpeters
American male trumpeters
Living people
Writers from Seattle
Musicians from Seattle
Year of birth missing (living people)
21st-century American musicians
American people of Nigerian descent
African-American jazz composers
African-American jazz musicians
African-American writers
21st-century trumpeters
American male jazz composers
American jazz composers
21st-century American male musicians
21st-century African-American musicians